Chandigarh Metro was a proposed rapid transit system for the city and union territory of Chandigarh in India. The project was scrapped in 2017 due to viability.

History
Delhi Metro Rail Corporation submitted the detailed project report of the Chandigarh Metro Project to Punjab Governor and UT administrator Shivraj Patil on 16 August 2012.

On 9 July 2015, in the presence of Kaptan Singh Solanki, who is the Governor of Punjab and Administrator of Chandigarh as well as the Governor of Haryana, the MoU was signed by the Additional Chief Secretary, Haryana Town and Country Planning Department, P Raghavendra Rao, the Secretary, Town and Planning, Punjab, A Venu Prasad, and the UT Adviser, Vijay Kumar Dev. As part of the MoU, the three parties also named the special purpose vehicle (SPV) to execute the project as the Greater Chandigarh Transport Corporation (GCTC) for the development of comprehensive integrated multi-modal urban and sub-urban commuter system for the region.
The initial equity of the GCTC shall be Rs 100 crore, which will be contributed equally – 25 per cent each – by the Union Ministry of Urban Development, the UT Administration, Haryana and Punjab.

Plan
In the first phase, a 37.573 km metro rail network would be built of which 23.468 km would be elevated and 14.105 km underground Corridor. It would run from north to south. It would start near Capitol Complex and would go up to Mohali. Corridor II, also known as East West Corridor, would start from Sector 21, Panchkula and reach up to Mullanpur.

Routes
The proposed routes for the various corridors of the metro network are as follows:
 Corridor 1: Khuda Lahora to IT Park via Punjab University, PGI, Government College, General Hospital, Sector 17- Interchange, Sector 8, Sector 7, Sector 26, Grain Market, Transport Nagar, Chandigarh Railway Station, Manimajra, covering a distance of approximately 16.000 km.
 Corridor II: Sectt. Sector 1 Chandigarh to Bus terminal Sector 104 S.A.S Nagar, Mohali, via Rock Garden, Sector 9, Sector 17 interchange, Sector 17 ISBT, Sector 22-Aroma Hotel Sector 34, Bus Terminal Sector 43, Sector 52, Mohali Sector 62, Sector 60, Sector 72, Sector 71, Sector 75, Sector 76, Sector 77, Sector 78, Sector 87, Sector 97, Sector 106, Sector 105 covering a distance of 22 km.
 Corridor III : Timber Market Chowk Sector 26 to Sector 38 and Dadu Majra along Purv Marg and Vikas Marg covering a distance of approximately 14.6 km.
 Corridor – IV: Housing Board Chowk to Sector 21 Panchkula, via Panchkula Sector 17,16,15,14, & 21 covering a distance of 5 km.

Cost
The project is expected to cost , out of which  will be borne by Chandigarh Administration,  will be borne by Punjab Govt. and the remaining  by Haryana Govt. The metro will be completed in two phases.

See also
 Transport in India
 Rapid transit in India
 List of rapid transit systems
 Delhi Metro

References

External links 
 Chandigarh Metro Rail Project

Proposed rapid transit in India
Rail transport in Chandigarh
Airport rail links in India
Standard gauge railways in India